Prof. Dr. Mohamed Shaker El-Markabi is an Egyptian engineer and government official. He was chosen by Engineer Ibrahim Mahlab minister to take over the Ministry of Electricity and Renewable Energy. He is Mohamed Hamed Shaker El-Markabi Professor of Electrical Power Engineering at the Faculty of Engineering, Cairo University.

Early life 
He graduated from the Faculty of Engineering, Cairo University in 1968 and earned a doctorate in electrical engineering from the Imperial College, University of London in 1978.

Education 
 B.Sc. in Electrical Power Engineering from Faculty of Engineering, Cairo University in 1968.
 M.Sc. in Electrical Power Engineering from Faculty of Engineering, Cairo University in 1972.
 Ph.D. in Electrical Power Engineering from Imperial College, London University in 1978.

Career 
He taught at the Faculty of Engineering, Cairo University, and began consultative work in 1982. He established an office advisory in the field of electrical and mechanical consulting. His office has a presence in multiple Arab countries. He worked as an engineer consultant for more than 1,500 projects, and worked with global consulting offices. He is the first Minister of Electricity and Renewable Energy to introduce nuclear power to Egypt.

Recognition 
 "Premium Award in Science and Technology" from Institute of Electrical Engineers (IEE) UK in 1985.

External links 
 Dr. Mohamed Shaker El-Markabi

Cairo University alumni
Alumni of the University of London
Year of birth missing (living people)
Living people
Electricity and Energy ministers of Egypt
21st-century Egyptian politicians